István Bárczy (3 October 1866 – 1 June 1943) was a Hungarian politician and jurist, who served as Minister of Justice between 1919 and 1920. He was the Mayor of Budapest between 1906 and 1918 and later served as Lord Mayor of Budapest (the representative of the Hungarian government in the capital city until 1945). He was a member of the Diet of Hungary from 1920 to 1931.

Sources

1866 births
1943 deaths
Justice ministers of Hungary
Mayors of Budapest
Lord Mayors of Budapest